Gable and Lombard is a 1976 American biographical film directed by Sidney J. Furie. The screenplay by Barry Sandler is based on the romance and consequent marriage of screen stars Clark Gable and Carole Lombard. The original music score was composed by Michel Legrand.

Plot
The pair meet at a Hollywood party, where rugged leading man Gable eschews evening wear and screwball comedian Lombard arrives in an ambulance that wrecks his car. They argue. He threatens to spank her. She punches him on the jaw. The two clearly dislike each other, and intensely so, but as fate conspires to bring them together again and again, they begin to admire each other and fall in love.

The fly in the ointment is Gable's second wife Ria. Metro-Goldwyn-Mayer studio chief Louis B. Mayer fears any publicity about his affair with Lombard will jeopardize Gable's career, and since he is MGM's most valuable player, Mayer becomes protective of his star. Gable and Lombard fish, play practical jokes on each other, laugh, fight, and have fun making up. His wife finally grants him a divorce, and the two wed. The happily ever after ending is thwarted when Lombard is killed in a plane crash while promoting the purchase of defense bonds during World War II.

Principal cast
James Brolin as Clark Gable
Jill Clayburgh as Carole Lombard
Allen Garfield as Louis B. Mayer
Red Buttons as Ivan Cooper
Joanne Linville as Ria Gable
Melanie Mayron as Dixie
Alice Backes as Hedda Hopper
Ross Elliot as Lombard's Director
Morgan Brittany as Vivien Leigh

Production
Production design was done by Edward C. Carfagno and costume design was provided by Edith Head.

Critical reception
In his review in The New York Times, Vincent Canby called the film 

Roger Ebert of the Chicago Sun-Times described the film as a "mushy, old-fashioned extravaganza" and added, 

Gene Siskel of the Chicago Tribune slammed the "overwhelming" audacity of the film: 

Variety called it 

Time Out London says, 

TV Guide awarded it one out of a possible four stars, calling it

References

External links
 
 
 
 

1976 films
1970s biographical films
1976 romantic drama films
American biographical films
American romantic drama films
Biographical films about actors
Cultural depictions of Clark Gable
1970s English-language films
Films scored by Michel Legrand
American films based on actual events
Films directed by Sidney J. Furie
Films set in the 1930s
Films set in the 1940s
Films set in California
Universal Pictures films
1970s American films